The Crandon shooting was a mass murder that occurred about 2:45 a.m. CDT on October 7, 2007, at a post-homecoming party inside a duplex in Crandon, Wisconsin, United States. The perpetrator, 20-year-old Tyler James Peterson (March 6, 1987 – October 7, 2007), who was a full-time deputy in the Forest County Sheriff's Department and a part-time officer with the Crandon Police Department, shot and killed six people and critically injured a seventh before committing suicide. One of the victims, 18-year-old Jordanne Michele Murray, was Peterson's former girlfriend, and it was believed that a dispute within the apartment motivated the shooting.

Overview
Peterson, who was not on duty at the time of the shooting, entered an apartment complex where a homecoming party was held at approximately 2:45 a.m. CDT. There, he shot seven people, ages 14 to 20, killing six of them and wounding the seventh. Peterson fled the scene and was confronted by authorities at a cabin later that day. His cause of death was initially believed to have been from a gunshot fired by a police sniper, but it was later discovered that he committed suicide by multiple gunshots. Police have determined that approximately 30 rounds were fired throughout the duration of the shooting.

Victims
All seven victims were either students or recent graduates of Crandon High School. The seventh played dead after being shot three times and survived.

See also 
 List of homicides in Wisconsin
 List of rampage killers in the United States

References

External links

 Documents fill in lost hours after gunman killed six in Crandon
 Horror and healing in Crandon 
 Wisconsin Town in Shock

2007 in Wisconsin
2007 mass shootings in the United States
2007 murders in the United States
Attacks in the United States in 2007
Crimes in Wisconsin
Deaths by firearm in Wisconsin
Forest County, Wisconsin
Mass murder in 2007
Mass murder in Wisconsin
Mass shootings in the United States
Mass shootings in Wisconsin
Murder in Wisconsin
Murder–suicides in Wisconsin
Murdered American children
October 2007 events in the United States
People murdered by law enforcement officers in the United States